= IR IBBI =

IR IBBI or IRIB4K is one of the 32 national television channels in Iran.

This channel is the world's first Persian-language television network with 4K resolution. Iranian television considered this network a "great success".
